Antonio Capua (19 October 1905 - 12 April 1996) was an Italian politician.

Capua was born in Melicuccà.  He represented the Common Man's Front in the Constituent Assembly of Italy from 1946 to 1948 and the Italian Liberal Party in the Chamber of Deputies from 1948 to 1972.

References

1905 births
1996 deaths
People from the Province of Reggio Calabria
Common Man's Front politicians
Italian Liberal Party politicians
Italian Social Movement politicians
Members of the Constituent Assembly of Italy
Deputies of Legislature I of Italy
Deputies of Legislature II of Italy
Deputies of Legislature III of Italy
Deputies of Legislature IV of Italy
Deputies of Legislature V of Italy
Senators of Legislature VI of Italy
Politicians of Calabria